Antichrist is the second studio album by Norwegian black metal band Gorgoroth. The working title of the album was Død (meaning death or dead). It was released by Malicious Records on 3 June 1996 on vinyl (limited to 500 copies) and CD. It was re-released several times: by Century Black in 1999, as a remastered version by Season of Mist in 2005, on vinyl in 2005 on Agonia Records (limited to 1000 copies), and on vinyl in 2006 on Back on Black Records. The latter was released in a gatefold sleeve, and included a guitar pick signed by Infernus. It was the first album to feature Pest on vocals and Frost on drums, and the last album to feature Hat on vocals.

Track listing

Season of Mist re-release
The Season of Mist re-release included a 13-second instrumental, although the album cover still only lists the original six tracks. According to iTunes, this song is called "Wind".

Credits

Gorgoroth
Infernus – guitar; bass
Frost – drums

Other personnel

Vocals
Hat – (2, 3 and 6)
Pest – "Possessed (By Satan)"

References

Gorgoroth albums
1996 albums
Season of Mist albums